Demotic (from  dēmotikós, 'popular') is the ancient Egyptian script derived from northern forms of hieratic used in the Nile Delta, and the stage of the Egyptian language written in this script, following Late Egyptian and preceding Coptic. The term was first used by the Greek historian Herodotus to distinguish it from hieratic and hieroglyphic scripts. By convention, the word "Demotic" is capitalized in order to distinguish it from demotic Greek.

Script
The script was used for more than a thousand years, and during that time a number of developmental stages occurred. It is written and read from right to left, while earlier hieroglyphs could be written from top to bottom, left to right, or right to left. Parts of the Demotic Greek Magical Papyri were written with a cypher script.

Early Demotic
Early Demotic (often referred to by the German term ) developed in Lower Egypt during the later part of the Twenty-fifth Dynasty, particularly found on steles from the Serapeum of Saqqara. It is generally dated between 650 and 400 BC, as most texts written in Early Demotic are dated to the Twenty-sixth Dynasty and the subsequent rule as a satrapy of the Achaemenid Empire, which was known as the Twenty-seventh Dynasty. After the reunification of Egypt under Psamtik I, Demotic replaced Abnormal Hieratic in Upper Egypt, particularly during the reign of Amasis II, when it became the official administrative and legal script. During this period, Demotic was used only for administrative, legal, and commercial texts, while hieroglyphs and hieratic were reserved for religious texts and literature.

Middle (Ptolemaic) Demotic
Middle Demotic (c. 400–30 BC) is the stage of writing used during the Ptolemaic Kingdom. From the 4th century BC onwards, Demotic held a higher status, as may be seen from its increasing use for literary and religious texts. By the end of the 3rd century BC, Koine Greek was more important, as it was the administrative language of the country; Demotic contracts lost most of their legal force unless there was a note in Greek of being registered with the authorities.

Late (Roman) Demotic
From the beginning of Roman rule of Egypt, Demotic was progressively less used in public life. There are, however, a number of literary texts written in Late Demotic (c. 30 BC – 452 AD), especially from the 1st and 2nd centuries AD, though the quantity of all Demotic texts decreased rapidly towards the end of the second century. In contrast to the way Latin eliminated languages in the western part of the Empire, Greek did not replace Demotic entirely. After that, Demotic was only used for a few ostraca, subscriptions to Greek texts, mummy labels, and graffiti. The last dated example of the Demotic script is a graffito on the walls of the temple of Isis at Philae, dated to December 12, 452. The text simply reads "Petise, son of Petosiris"; who Petise was is unknown.

Uniliteral signs and transliteration
Like its hieroglyphic predecessor script, Demotic possessed a set of "uniliteral" or "alphabetical" signs that could be used to represent individual phonemes. These are the most common signs in Demotic, making up between one third and one half of all signs in any given text; foreign words are also almost exclusively written with these signs. Later (Roman Period) texts used these signs even more frequently.

The table below gives a list of such uniliteral signs along with their conventional transcription, their hieroglyphic origin, the Coptic letters derived from them, and notes on usage.

Language

Demotic is a development of the Late Egyptian language and shares much with the later Coptic phase of the Egyptian language. In the earlier stages of Demotic, such as those texts written in the Early Demotic script, it probably represented the spoken idiom of the time. But, as it was increasingly used for only literary and religious purposes, the written language diverged more and more from the spoken form, leading to significant diglossia between the Late Demotic texts and the spoken language of the time, similar to the use of classical Middle Egyptian during the Ptolemaic Period.

Phonology
The most important source of information about Demotic phonology is Coptic. The consonant inventory of Demotic can be reconstructed on the basis of evidence from the Coptic dialects. Demotic orthography is relatively opaque. The Demotic “alphabetical” signs are mostly inherited from the hieroglyphic script, and due to historical sound changes they do not always map neatly onto Demotic phonemes. However, the Demotic script does feature certain orthographic innovations, such as the use of the sign  for //, which allow it to represent sounds that were not present in earlier forms of Egyptian.

The Demotic consonants can be divided into two primary classes: obstruents (stops, affricates and fricatives) and sonorants (approximants, nasals, and semivowels). Voice is not a contrastive feature; all obstruents are voiceless and all sonorants are voiced. Stops may be either aspirated or tenuis (unaspirated), although there is evidence that aspirates merged with their tenuis counterparts in certain environments.

The following table presents the consonants of Demotic Egyptian. The reconstructed value of a phoneme is given in IPA transcription, followed by a transliteration of the corresponding Demotic “alphabetical” sign(s) in angle brackets .

Decipherment
The Rosetta Stone was discovered in 1799. It is inscribed with a proclamation, written in three scripts: Egyptian hieroglyphs, Demotic, and the Greek alphabet. There are 32 lines of Demotic, which is the middle of the three scripts on the stone. The Demotic was deciphered before the hieroglyphs, starting with the efforts of Antoine Isaac Silvestre de Sacy. Scholars were eventually able to translate the hieroglyphs by comparing them with the Greek words, which could be readily translated, and fortifying that process by applying knowledge of Coptic (the Coptic language being descended from earlier forms of Egyptian represented in hieroglyphic writing). Egyptologists, linguists and papyrologists who specialize in the study of the Demotic stage of Egyptian script are known as Demotists.

See also
Transliteration of Ancient Egyptian

Notes

References

External links

Demotic and Abnormal Hieratic Texts
List of all Demotic texts in Trismegistos
Chicago Demotic Dictionary
The American Society of Papyrologists
Directory of Institutions and Scholars Involved in Demotic Studies
Demotic Texts on the Internet
Thus Wrote 'Onchsheshonqy: An Introductory Grammar of Demotic by Janet H. Johnson
Demotische Grammatik by Wilhelm Spiegelberg 
Hieratic/Demotic Fonts 

Ancient Egyptian language
Demotic
Demotic
Writing systems of Africa
Obsolete writing systems
Languages attested from the 7th century BC
Languages extinct in the 5th century